James Quentin "Big Jim" Wright (March 19, 1966 – September 29, 2018) was an American musician, composer, songwriter, film score and record producer. A member of the vocal and instrumental ensemble Sounds of Blackness, Wright became a frequent collaborator of production duo Jimmy Jam and Terry Lewis and an in-house producer for their company, Flyte Tyme Productions, in the 1990s.

Career
Wright was born in Rockford, Illinois. The son of Jenniel Wright and Alan Jackson, he lived most of his life in Rockford, also living in Roscoe as well as Rancho Cucamonga, California, and Atlanta, Georgia. In 1984, he graduated from Rockford West High School before relocating to Eden Prairie, Minnesota.

In Minnesota, Wright joined the  vocal and instrumental ensemble Sounds of Blackness, serving as the band's producer, arranger and composer. Through band member Ann Nesby he became connected to songwriter-producer Terry Lewis who Lewis offered Wright an exclusive publishing contract with their company, Flyte Tyme Production, while he was still providing lead vocals and keyboards for Sounds of Blackness.

In 1999, he wrote and produced Yolanda Adams's NAACP Image Award-winning song "Open My Heart." In 2004, Wright won the Black Reel Award for Best Original or Adapted Song for his contribution on "He Still Loves Me" for the soundtrack of the musical comedy film The Fighting Temptations (2003). In 2006, he won the Grammy Award for Best Gospel Song for co-writing Adams' song "Be Blessed" from her album Day by Day (2006).

Death
On September 29, 2018, Wright was found dead in his Rockford home.

Discography

Singles 
"Til I Found You" (Jam & Lewis & Sounds of Blackness featuring Ann Nesby, Big Jim Wright & Lauren Evans) (2019)

Selected credits

References

External links

1966 births
2018 deaths
African-American songwriters
African-American record producers
African-American male singer-songwriters
20th-century African-American people
21st-century African-American people
People from Rockford, Illinois